Dorothy Ames Jeffress, known as Amy Jeffress, is an attorney and former public official in the United States. She is a partner at the law firm Arnold & Porter.

Early life and education
Jeffress is the daughter of William H. Jeffress Jr., a prominent Washington defense attorney, and Judith Jeffress, a social worker. Jeffress graduated from Williams College and obtained a master's degree in political science from the Free University of Berlin. She completed her Juris Doctor degree at Yale Law School. She worked as a law clerk for Judge Gerhard A. Gesell, and then, following his death in 1993, completed her clerkship with Judge Thomas F. Hogan.

Career
During the Clinton administration, Jeffress worked for the U.S. Department of Justice (DOJ) as a prosecutor. She worked as a national security counselor to Attorney General Eric Holder and then as the Justice department attache at the U.S. embassy in London for three years. During her tenure as a national security prosecutor at the DOJ, she consulted with U.S. District Judge Royce Lamberth, who then agreed in 2008 to unseal documents from the FBI investigation into the 2001 anthrax attacks. As an advisor to Holder, she created interagency task forces to review the cases of detainees at the Guantanamo Bay detention camp.

In 2014, Jeffress joined the law firm Arnold & Porter as a partner, with a focus on criminal defense, national security law, and white collar business practices. In November 2015, she was also appointed as a public advocate at the Foreign Intelligence Surveillance Court (FISC). As a public advocate, she contributed as an amicus curae after being asked to examine intelligence gathering and retention practices by national security agencies and the FBI, and she wrote the FBI practices "go far beyond the purpose for which the Section 702-acquired information is collected in permitting queries that are unrelated to national security" and "These practices do not comply with ... the Fourth Amendment."

In 2016, Jeffress participated in the mock trial of Winston vs. Oceania, based on the George Orwell novel 1984, which aired on C-SPAN. In 2018, Jeffress represented Lisa Page. In 2020 and 2021, Jeffress represented Anne Sacoolas, the wife of a U.S. diplomat involved in a fatal car crash in the United Kingdom.

Honors and awards
 2006 Attorney General's John Marshall Award

Personal life
Her brother Jonathan Jeffress has worked for the Office of the Federal Public Defender.

Jeffress is married to Christopher R. Cooper, Judge of the United States District Court for the District of Columbia. Merrick Garland officiated at their wedding.

References

Year of birth missing (living people)
Living people
Williams College alumni
Free University of Berlin alumni
Yale Law School alumni
21st-century American lawyers
21st-century American women lawyers
Law clerks
United States Department of Justice lawyers
Arnold & Porter people